First Time or The First Time may refer to:

Film and television

Films
 The First Time (1952 film), an American comedy-drama directed by Frank Tashlin
 The First Time (1969 film), an American coming-of-age film directed by James Neilson
 The First Time, a 1982 American television film starring Jennifer Jason Leigh
 First Time, a 1983 Hong Kong film produced by Peter Yang
 The First Time, a 1983 comedy featuring Wendie Jo Sperber
 First Time, a 2003 Philippine film featuring Ryan Eigenmann
 The First Time (2012 film), an American teen romantic comedy by Jon Kasdan
 First Time (2012 film), a Chinese romance film directed by Han Yan

Television 
 First Time (TV series), a 2010 Philippine romantic drama

Episodes
 "First Time" (South of Nowhere)
 "The First Time" (Glee)
 "The First Time" (One Day at a Time)
 "The First Time" (That '70s Show)

Literature 
 First Time, a 2008 novel by Meg Tilly
 First-Time: The Historical Vision of an Afro-American People, a 1983 book by Richard Price

Music

Albums
 First Time (Maya Simantov album) or the title song, 2005
 First Time (Morning Musume album), 1998
 First Time! The Count Meets the Duke, by Count Basie and Duke Ellington, 1961
 First Time (EP), by Liam Payne, or the title song, 2018
 The First Time (Billy "Crash" Craddock album) or the title song (see below), 1977
 The First Time (Kelsea Ballerini album) or the title song (see below), 2015
 First Time, by Jackie Chan, 1992
 First Time, by the Piper Downs, 1995

Songs
 "1st Time", by Yung Joc, 2006
 "1st Time", by Bakar, 2020
 "First Time" (Ai song), 2022
 "First Time" (Carly Rae Jepsen song), 2016
 "First Time" (Jebediah song), 2004
 "First Time" (Jonas Brothers song), 2013
 "First Time" (The Kelly Family song), 1995
 "First Time" (Kygo and Ellie Goulding song), 2017
 "First Time" (Lifehouse song), 2007
 "First Time" (M-22 song), 2017
 "First Time" (Robin Beck song), 1988
 "First Time" (Vance Joy song), 2014
 "The First Time" (Damon Boyd vs. Mondo Rock song), 2004
 "The First Time" (Freddie Hart song), 1975
 "The First Time" (Matt Fishel song), 2011
 "The First Time" (Surface song), 1990
 "First Time", by Andy Grammer from Naive, 2019
 "First Time", by BoDeans from Still, 2008
 "First Time", by Boys Like Girls from Crazy World, 2012
 "First Time", by Daya, 2020
 "First Time", by Fabolous from From Nothin' to Somethin', 2007
 "First Time", by Finger Eleven from The Greyest of Blue Skies, 2000
 "First Time", by Grey, 2019
 "First Time", by Illenium and Iann Dior, 2021
 "First Time", by IMx from IMx, 2001
 "First Time", by Jaheim from Appreciation Day, 2013
 "First Time", by Jesse Ware from Glasshouse, 2017
 "First Time", by Michael Sembello from Bossa Nova Hotel, 1983
 "First Time", by Nicole Scherzinger from Big Fat Lie, 2014
 "First Time", by Red Velvet from The Velvet, 2016
 "First Time", by Styx from Cornerstone, 1979
 "First Time", by Twice from Taste of Love, 2021
 "The First Time", by Adam Faith, 1963
 "The First Time", by Billy "Crash" Craddock from Easy as Pie, 1976
 "The First Time", by Blink-182 from Nine, 2019
 "The First Time", by Kelsea Ballerini from Kelsea Ballerini, 2014
 "The First Time", by U2 from Zooropa, 1993

See also
 For the First Time (disambiguation)
 The First Time Ever I Saw Your Face (disambiguation)